The Mbombe 6 is a mine-protected, high-mobility armoured fighting vehicle produced by Paramount Group from South Africa that was launched in 2010. "Mbombe" is named after an African warrior.

Vehicle specifications
The Mbombe 6's unladen weight is 16 tonnes. Its maximum combat weight is 27 tonnes with a crew of 11. It has 6x6 wheel drive for use on different kinds of terrain. Its maximum speed is 100 km/h; its range is 700 km.

The Mbombe 6 has a 300 kW Cummins ISBe4 diesel engine and an Allison 6 speed automatic transmission.

Armour
The Mbombe 6 hull meets STANAG 4569 Level 4, which means the vehicle can withstand a 10 kg TNT blast under its hull or any wheel station. As standard, the Mbombe 6 can protect its crew against Rocket-propelled grenades, while additional modules protect against IEDs, up to 50 kg TNT at 5 metres.

Armament
The Mbombe 6 is armed with a heavy machine gun or an autocannon. The Mbombe 6 can be fitted with day and night vision equipment.

Functions
The Mbombe 6 can be configured as an Armoured Personnel Carrier, Combat Vehicle, Command Vehicle or ambulance.

Operators

 : 50 on order.
 : Barys is a Kazakh version of the Mbombe
 : Unknown number delivered to Libya from Jordan in 2019.

Variants 
Official variant:
APC
Armoured ambulance
Infantry fire support vehicle
Anti-armour fire support vehicle

Kalyani M4 
The Kalyani M4 is a prototype developed by India's Kalyani Group.

References

External links
Mbombe 6 specifications in Paramount Group website

Armoured fighting vehicles of the post–Cold War period
Armoured personnel carriers of South Africa
Military vehicles introduced in the 2010s
Peacekeeping operations
Six-wheeled vehicles
Wheeled armoured fighting vehicles